Luc René Decker (born 3 March 1977 in Luxembourg City) is a Luxembourgian former swimmer, who specialized in butterfly events. He represented his nation Luxembourg at the 2000 Summer Olympics, and held three Luxembourgian records in all butterfly distances (50, 100, and 200 m).

Decker competed only in the men's 100 m butterfly at the 2000 Summer Olympics in Sydney. He achieved a FINA B-cut of 55.93 from the European Long Course Meet in Luxembourg City. He challenged seven other swimmers in heat three, including Kyrgyzstan's Konstantin Ushkov, silver medalist for Russia in Atlanta four years earlier, and Uzbekistan's top favorite Ravil Nachaev. He raced to a fourth seed by almost a full second behind winner Nachaev in 56.10. Decker failed to advance into the semifinals, as he placed forty-seventh overall in the prelims.

Since his retirement came after the Olympics, Decker completed his master of science degree in political economy at Paris-Sorbonne University, and later worked for investment promotion at the Ministry of the Economy and Foreign Trade in Luxembourg. On July 1, 2013, Decker has been appointed as the consul general for Luxembourg and an executive director of the Luxembourg Trade and Investment in Shanghai, China.

References

1977 births
Living people
Luxembourgian male swimmers
Olympic swimmers of Luxembourg
Swimmers at the 2000 Summer Olympics
Male butterfly swimmers
Sportspeople from Luxembourg City